Eucalyptus pumila, commonly known as the Pokolbin mallee, is a species of mallee that is endemic[ to New South Wales. It has smooth bark, lance-shaped to curved or elliptical adult leaves, flower buds in groups of seven, white flowers and hemispherical or cup-shaped fruit.

Description
It has smooth copper-coloured bark that fades to grey and is shed in strips. Flowering occurs between February and August and the flowers are white.

Taxonomy and naming
Eucalyptus pumila was first formally described in 1919 by Richard Cambage in Journal and Proceedings of the Royal Society of New South Wales. The specific epithet (pumila) is from the Latin pumilis meaning "dwarf" referring to the habit of this mallee.

Distribution and habitat
Pokolbin mallee is restricted to the northern end of the Broken Back Range near Pokolbin where it grows in pure stands among sandstone rock outcrops on a steep hill. There are also historical records from Wyong and Sandy Hollow.

Conservation status
This mallee is listed as "vulnerable" under the Australian Government Environment Protection and Biodiversity Conservation Act 1999 and the New South Wales Government Biodiversity Conservation Act 2016 . The main threats to the species are its small population size and inappropriate fire regimes.

Gallery

See also
List of Eucalyptus species

References

Trees of Australia
pumila
Myrtales of Australia
Flora of New South Wales
Mallees (habit)
Plants described in 1919